Brau und Brunnen AG ("Brew and Spring") was a German brewing and beverage group which was formed as "Dortmunder Union-Schultheiss Brauerei AG" in 1972 through a merger between Schultheiss-Brauerei and Dortmunder Union-Brauerei. It was renamed Brau und Brunnen in 1988. It owned a number of formerly independent breweries, including Einbecker Brewery. Until the early 1990s, Brau und Brunnen was the largest beverage company in Germany, but its market share steadily declined throughout the 1990s. An additional cause for the decline was the company's purchase of Bavaria – St. Pauli Brewery and Jever for an estimated 800 million DM, although these purchases were later estimated to only be worth closer to 250 million DM. Other companies engaged in a series of mergers and acquisitions, and by 1999, it had sunk to the fourth-largest beverage company and was continually losing money. After unsuccessful internal reorganizations, the company was purchased by Dr. August Oetker KG and integrated into its subsidiary Radeberger Gruppe.

See also

References

External links
 

Beer in Germany
German companies established in 1972
Food and drink companies established in 1972
Companies formerly in the MDAX